Johann Olav Koss,  (born 29 October 1968) is a former speed skater from Norway. He won four Olympic gold medals, including three at the 1994 Winter Olympics in his home country.

Biography
Johann Olav Koss was born in Drammen, Buskerud County, Norway. Johann Olav Koss became the Norwegian Junior Champion in 1987, but he could not compete with the world top skaters in the 1986 and 1987 World Junior Championships. In 1988, he debuted with the seniors at the World Championships in Alma-Ata, but failed to qualify for the final distance. The following year, he finished eighth in the same tournament (after a fifteenth place in the European Allround Championships), placing second on the 1,500 m. His breakthrough came in 1990, winning the World Allround Championships in Innsbruck, Austria. The following four years, he would win two more world titles (1991 and 1994), while finishing second in 1993 and third in 1992. He won the European Allround Championships in 1991 and finished second in the next three editions. Koss had a total of twenty-three World Cup wins, while winning four overall World Cup titles (the 1,500 m in 1990 and 1991, and the combined 5,000/10,000 m in 1991 and 1994).

Koss made his Olympic debut at the 1992 Winter Olympics, finishing seventh on the 5,000 m, five days after undergoing surgery because of an inflamed pancreas. He would recover to win gold on the 1,500 m (by only 0.04 seconds over his countryman Ådne Søndrål) and silver on the 10,000 m (behind Dutch skater Bart Veldkamp).

In 1994, the final year of his speed skating career, Koss also gained fame outside the speed skating world by winning three gold medals at the 1994 Winter Olympics in his native Norway, winning all races in new world records, two of which would remain unbeaten until the clap skate era. For his performance, he was named Sports Illustrated magazine's Sportsman of the Year in 1994, together with Bonnie Blair. In addition, he received the Oscar Mathisen Award three times: in 1990, 1991, and 1994.

After his speed skating career, Koss trained as a physician at the University of Queensland in Australia. He became a UNICEF ambassador and a member of the International Olympic Committee (until 2002). He married Canadian businessperson and politician Belinda Stronach on 31 December 1999, but they divorced in 2003.

in 2000, Koss founded the Canadian-based International Humanitarian Organisation, Right To Play, which uses sport and play as a tool for the development of children and youth in the most disadvantaged areas of the world. The organization operates in more than 20 countries reaching over one million children each week and is supported by more than 620 staff worldwide and over 14,900 volunteer Coaches.  In August 2015, Koss transitioned in to the role of Founder at Right To Play where he still stays very active in a variety of fundraising initiatives, and where he maintains his seat on the International Board of Directors.

He married his second wife, Jennifer Lee, in New York on 23 May 2009. Lee's friend Chelsea Clinton was one of the bridesmaids.  Lee is a Harvard College, University of Oxford, and Harvard Business School graduate, and a former cellist who studied at The Juilliard School. She is the granddaughter of Kim Chung Yul, the former Prime Minister of South Korea and Chief of the Korean Armed Forces during the Korean War. She is the Co-Founder of a retail business called BRIKA which sells products from under-the-radar artisans and makers. She is a former management consultant and most recently a private equity investment professional at Ontario Teachers' Private Capital in Toronto. They have four children together, Aksel, Annabelle, Andreas and Aleksander.

In November 2009, after American Peter Mueller was stripped of his coaching role with Norway for an inappropriate comment to a female team member, Koss was appointed head coach, despite no previous coaching experience. Association sporting director Oystein Haugen told Reuters that Koss has been a revelation despite no previous coaching experience.

Koss completed his Executive MBA at the Joseph L. Rotman School of Management in the University of Toronto in Canada. He has Honorary Doctorates from several universities - Brock University, University of Calgary, Vrije Universiteit Brussels, and the University of Agder in Norway. On 1 July 2015, Koss was made an Honorary Member of the Order of Canada (CM).

At the 2018 Olympic Games Koss was inducted into the Olympians for Life project for using sport to make a better world.

Medals
An overview of medals won by Koss at important championships he participated in, listing the years in which he won each:

Records

World records
Koss skated ten world records:

Source: SpeedSkatingStats.com

Personal records
To put these personal records in perspective, the WR column lists the official world records on the dates that Koss skated his personal records.

Source: SpeedskatingResults.com

Koss was number one on the Adelskalender, the all-time allround speed skating ranking, for a total of 1,998 days, divided over three periods between 1992 and 1997. He has an Adelskalender score of 155.099 points.

See also
List of multiple Olympic gold medalists at a single Games

References

Other sources
 Eng, Trond. All Time International Championships, Complete Results: 1889 - 2002. Askim, Norway: WSSSA-Skøytenytt, 2002.
 Eng, Trond; Gjerde, Arild and Teigen, Magne. Norsk Skøytestatistikk Gjennom Tidene, Menn/Kvinner, 1999 (6. utgave). Askim/Skedsmokorset/Veggli, Norway: WSSSA-Skøytenytt, 1999.
 Eng, Trond; Gjerde, Arild; Teigen, Magne and Teigen, Thorleiv. Norsk Skøytestatistikk Gjennom Tidene, Menn/Kvinner, 2004 (7. utgave). Askim/Skedsmokorset/Veggli/Hokksund, Norway: WSSSA-Skøytenytt, 2004.
 Eng, Trond and Teigen, Magne. Komplette Resultater fra offisielle Norske Mesterskap på skøyter, 1894 - 2005. Askim/Veggli, Norway: WSSSA-Skøytenytt, 2005.
 Teigen, Magne. Komplette Resultater Norske Mesterskap På Skøyter, 1887 - 1989: Menn/Kvinner, Senior/Junior. Veggli, Norway: WSSSA-Skøytenytt, 1989.
 Teigen, Magne. Komplette Resultater Internasjonale Mesterskap 1889 - 1989: Menn/Kvinner, Senior/Junior, allround/sprint. Veggli, Norway: WSSSA-Skøytenytt, 1989.

External links
 Johann Olav Koss at SpeedSkatingStats.com
 Personal records from Jakub Majerski's Speedskating Database
 Evert Stenlund's Adelskalender pages
 Page honouring Johann Koss on the website of the 2008 Summer Olympics

1968 births
Living people
Sportspeople from Drammen
Sportspeople from Toronto
World record setters in speed skating
Members of the Order of Canada
Norwegian male speed skaters
21st-century Norwegian physicians
Olympic speed skaters of Norway
Olympic gold medalists for Norway
Olympic silver medalists for Norway
Speed skaters at the 1992 Winter Olympics
Speed skaters at the 1994 Winter Olympics
International Olympic Committee members
University of Queensland alumni
University of Queensland Mayne Medical School alumni
University of Toronto alumni
Olympic medalists in speed skating
Medalists at the 1992 Winter Olympics
Medalists at the 1994 Winter Olympics
World Allround Speed Skating Championships medalists